Mappillai is a 1989 Indian Tamil-language masala film  directed by Rajasekhar, starring Rajinikanth, Srividya and Amala. It is a remake of the 1989 Telugu film Attaku Yamudu Ammayiki Mogudu, the Tamil version was produced by Geetha Arts, and Chiranjeevi who played the lead role in the original Telugu version made a special appearance in this film. The film received a positive response from the public and ran for 200+ days and became a blockbuster. The film was again remade in Tamil with the same title, 22 years later.

Plot 

Arumugam makes a blazing entrance, gatecrashing a marriage to abduct the bride. Geetha, the bride's friend, gets him arrested but then learns that he had rescued the girl from a forced marriage. Further revelations about him that he is a gold medalist and has a good heart make her fall in love with him. After some convincing, Aarumugam reciprocates too. Meanwhile, Aarumugam's sister is in love with the son of a rich woman Rajarajeswari. When Rajarajeswari learns of this, she foists a false case on her and puts her in jail. It is then that Aarumugam has his first encounter with Rajarajeswari. He then learns that she is none other than Geetha's mother. He also invites Geetha's mother Rajarajeswari to his marriage. Since Aarumugam has married Geetha against her mother's wishes, Rajarajeswari vows to separate them. During the marriage, Aarumugam calls his friend Chiranjeevi that there are goons to stop the marriage where Chiranjeevi comes fights off the goons and attends the marriage and wishes them good luck and leaves.
In contrast, Arumugam promises to prevent that and make Rajarajeswari understand that love and affection are more important than money.

Cast 
 Rajinikanth as Arumugam
 Srividya as Rajarajeswari
 Amala as Geetha
 Jaishankar as Ramanathan husband of Rajarajeswari
 Nizhalgal Ravi as Ravi
 Vinu Chakravarthy as Pakkirisamy
 S. S. Chandran as Vinayagam
 Dubbing Janaki
 Dilip as Dileep
 Raja as Raja
 R. S. Shivaji as Dilli
 Chiranjeevi as Chiranjeevi in a special appearance
 Lalitha Kumari as Dilip lover
 Srihari as one of the henchmen

Production 
Initially the role of the protagonist's mother-in-law was offered to Vyjayanthimala. But she refused the role after which it was given to Srividya.

Soundtrack 
The soundtrack was composed by Ilaiyaraaja. The song "Ennoda Raasi" was recreated for Mappillais 2011 remake.

Reception
P. S. S. of Kalki wrote this Mappillai has carefully observed the seated person without moving.

References

External links 
 

1980s masala films
1980s Tamil-language films
1989 films
Films directed by Rajasekhar (director)
Films scored by Ilaiyaraaja
Films with screenplays by Panchu Arunachalam
Geetha Arts films
Tamil remakes of Telugu films